The Buddhas of Bamiyan (or Bamyan) were two 6th-century monumental statues carved into the side of a cliff in the Bamyan valley of Hazarajat region in central Afghanistan,  northwest of Kabul at an elevation of . Carbon dating of the structural components of the Buddhas has determined that the smaller  "Eastern Buddha" was built around 570 CE, and the larger  "Western Buddha" was built around 618 CE, which would date both to the time when the Hephthalites ruled the region. On orders from Taliban founder Mullah Omar, the statues were destroyed in March 2001, after the Taliban government declared that they were idols. International and local opinion strongly condemned the destruction of the Buddhas.

The statues represented a later evolution of the classic blended style of ancient art in Afghanistan. Present-day inhabitants of the area, who follow Islam and speak the Hazaragi dialect of Dari Persian, call the larger statue Salsal ("the light shines through the universe") and identify it as male. The shorter statue is called Shamama ("Queen Mother") identifying it as a female figure. Technically, both were reliefs, as at their backs, they merged into the cliff wall. The main bodies were hewn directly from the sandstone cliffs, but details were modeled in mud mixed with straw, coated with stucco. This coating, the majority of which wore away long ago, was painted to enhance the expressions of the faces, hands, and folds of the robes; the larger one was painted carmine red, and the smaller one was painted multiple colors. The lower parts of the arms of the statues were constructed from the same mud-straw mix supported on wooden armatures. It is believed that the upper parts of their faces were made from great wooden masks. Rows of holes held wooden pegs that stabilized the outer stucco.

The Buddhas were surrounded by numerous caves and surfaces decorated with paintings. It is thought that these mostly dated from the 6th to 8th century CE, ending with the Muslim conquests of Afghanistan. The smaller works of art are considered as an artistic synthesis of Buddhist art and Gupta art from India, with influences from the Sasanian Empire and the Byzantine Empire, as well as the country of Tokharistan.

History

Commissioning 
Bamyan lies on the Silk Road, which runs through the Hindu Kush mountain region in the Bamyan Valley. The Silk Road has been historically a caravan route linking the markets of China with those of the Western world. It was the site of several Buddhist monasteries, and a thriving center for religion, philosophy, and art. Monks at the monasteries lived as hermits in small caves carved into the side of the Bamyan cliffs. Most of these monks embellished their caves with religious statuary and elaborate, brightly colored frescoes, sharing the culture of Gandhara.

Bamyan was a Buddhist religious site from the 2nd century CE up to the time of the Muslim conquest of the Abbasid Caliphate under Al-Mahdi in 770 CE. It became again Buddhist from 870 CE until the final Islamic conquest of 977 CE under the Turkic Ghaznavid dynasty. Murals in the adjoining caves have been carbon dated from 438 to 980 CE, suggesting that Buddhist artistic activity continued down to the final occupation by the Muslims.

The two most prominent statues were the giant standing sculptures of the Buddhas Vairocana and Sakyamuni (Gautama Buddha), identified by the different mudras performed. The Buddha popularly called "Solsol" measured 55 meters tall, and "Shahmama" 38 meters. The niches in which the figures stood are 58 and 38 meters respectively from bottom to top. Before being blown up in 2001, they were the largest examples of standing Buddha carvings in the world (the 8th century Leshan Giant Buddha is taller, but is sitting).

Following the destruction of the statues in 2001, carbon dating of organic internal structural components found in the rubble has determined that the two Buddhas were built , with narrow dates of between 544 and 595 CE for the 38-meter Eastern Buddha, and between 591 and 644 CE for the larger Western Buddha. Recent scholarship has also been giving broadly similar dates based on stylistic and historical analysis, although the similarities with the Art of Gandhara had generally encouraged an earlier dating in older literature.

Historic documentation refers to celebrations held every year attracting numerous pilgrims, with offers being made to the monumental statues. They were perhaps the most famous cultural landmarks of the region, and the site was listed by UNESCO as a World Heritage Site along with the surrounding cultural landscape and archaeological remains of the Bamyan Valley. Their colour faded through time.

Pre-modern times 
Chinese Buddhist pilgrim Xuanzang visited the site on 30 April 630, and described Bamyan in the Da Tang Xiyu Ji as a flourishing Buddhist center "with more than ten monasteries and more than a thousand monks". He also noted that both Buddha figures were "decorated with gold and fine jewels" (Wriggins, 1995). Intriguingly, Xuanzang mentions a third, even larger, reclining statue of the Buddha. A monumental seated Buddha, similar in style to those at Bamyan, still exists in the Bingling Temple caves in China's Gansu province.

Attacks on the Buddha's statue
In 1221, with the advent of Genghis Khan, "a terrible disaster befell Bamiyan". Nevertheless, the statues were spared. The Mughal founder Babur wrote in September 1528 that he ordered both be destroyed. Later, the Mughal emperor Aurangzeb tried to use heavy artillery to destroy the statues. The legs of the Buddhas were broken because of Aurangzeb's action. Another attempt to destroy the Bamiyan statues was made by the 18th century Persian king Nader Afshar, directing cannon fire at them.

The Afghan king Abdur Rahman Khan in the 19th century destroyed the upper part of the face of the larger figure during a military campaign against a Hazara rebellion in the area.

1998 to 2001 – Taliban 

During the Afghan Civil War, the area around the Buddhas was initially under the control of the Hezbe Wahdat—part of the Northern Alliance—who were against the Taliban. However, Mazar-i-Sharif fell in August 1998, and the Bamyan valley was entirely surrounded by Taliban. The town was captured on 13 September 1998 after a successful blockade.

Abdul Wahed, a local Taliban commander who had long before announced his intentions to obliterate the Buddhas, drilled holes in the Buddhas' heads into which he planned to load explosives. He was prevented from proceeding by Mohammed Omar, the de facto leader of the Taliban: According to United Nations representative Michael Semple: Other people blew off the head of the smaller Buddha using dynamite, aimed rockets at the larger Buddha's groin, and burnt tires at the latter's head. In July 1999, Omar decreed in favour of preserving the statues, and described plans to establish a tourism circuit. In early 2000, local Taliban authorities asked for the UN's assistance to rebuild drainage ditches around the tops of the alcoves where the Buddhas were set.

Destruction 

The statues were destroyed by dynamite over several weeks, starting on 2 March 2001.

The destruction was carried out in stages. Initially, the statues were fired at for several days using anti-aircraft guns and artillery. This caused severe damage, but did not obliterate them. During the destruction, Taliban Information Minister Qudratullah Jamal said that, "The destruction work is not as easy as people would think. You can't knock down the statues by dynamite or shelling as both of them have been carved in a cliff. They are firmly attached to the mountain." Later, the Taliban placed anti-tank mines at the bottom of the niches, so that when fragments of rock broke off from artillery fire, the statues would receive additional destruction from particles that set off the mines. In the end, the Taliban lowered men down the cliff face and placed explosives into holes in the Buddhas. After one of the explosions failed to obliterate the face of one of the Buddhas, a rocket was launched that left a hole in the remains of the stone head.

A local civilian, speaking to Voice of America in 2002, said that he and some other locals were forced to help destroy the statues. He also claimed that Pakistani and Arab engineers were involved in the destruction. Mullah Omar, during the destruction, was quoted as saying, "What are you complaining about? We are only waging war on stones".

On 6 March 2001, The Times quoted Omar as stating:

In an interview, Omar provided an ostensible explanation for his order to destroy the statues:

During a 13 March interview for Japan's Mainichi Shimbun, Afghan Foreign Minister Wakil Ahmad Mutawakel stated that the destruction was anything but a retaliation against the international community for economic sanctions: "We are destroying the statues in accordance with Islamic law and it is purely a religious issue." A statement issued by the ministry of religious affairs of the Taliban regime justified the destruction as being in accordance with Islamic law.

On 18 March 2001, The New York Times reported that a Taliban envoy said the Islamic government made its decision in a rage after a foreign delegation offered money to preserve the ancient works. The report also added, however, that other reports "have said the religious leaders were debating the move for months, and ultimately decided that the statues were idolatrous and should be obliterated".

Then Taliban ambassador-at-large Sayed Rahmatullah Hashemi said that the destruction of the statues was carried out by the Head Council of Scholars after a Swedish monuments expert proposed to restore the statues' heads. Rahmatullah Hashemi is reported as saying: "When the Afghan head council asked them to provide the money to feed the children instead of fixing the statues, they refused and said, 'No, the money is just for the statues, not for the children'. Herein, they made the decision to destroy the statues"; however, he did not comment on the claim that a foreign museum offered to "buy the Buddhist statues, the money from which could have been used to feed children". Rahmatullah Hashemi added: "If we had wanted to destroy those statues, we could have done it three years ago," referring to the start of U.S. sanctions. "In our religion, if anything is harmless, we just leave it. If money is going to statues while children are dying of malnutrition next door, then that makes it harmful, and we destroy it."

There is speculation that the destruction may have been influenced by al-Qaeda in order to further isolate the Taliban from the international community, thus tightening relations between the two; however, the evidence is circumstantial. Abdul Salam Zaeef held that the destruction of the Buddhas was finally ordered by Abdul Wali, the Minister for the Propagation of Virtue and the Prevention of Vice.

International reaction
The Taliban's intention to destroy the statues, declared on 27 February 2001, caused a wave of international horror and protest. According to UNESCO Director-General Kōichirō Matsuura, a meeting of ambassadors from the 54 member states of the Organisation of the Islamic Conference (OIC) was conducted. All OIC states—including Pakistan, Saudi Arabia, and the United Arab Emirates, three countries that officially recognised the Taliban government—joined the protest to spare the monuments. Saudi Arabia and the UAE later condemned the destruction as "savage". Although India never recognised the Taliban regime in Afghanistan, New Delhi offered to arrange for the transfer of all the artifacts in question to India, "where they would be kept safely and preserved for all mankind". These overtures were rejected by the Taliban. Pakistani president Pervez Musharraf sent a delegation led by Pakistan's interior minister Moinuddin Haider to Kabul to meet with Omar and try to prevent the destruction, arguing that it was un-Islamic and unprecedented. As recounted by Steve Coll:

According to Taliban minister, Abdul Salam Zaeef, UNESCO sent the Taliban government 36 letters objecting to the proposed destruction. He asserted that the Chinese, Japanese, and Sri Lankan delegates were the most strident advocates for preserving the Buddhas. The Japanese in particular proposed a variety of different solutions to the issue, including moving the statues to Japan, covering the statues from view, and the payment of money. The second edition of the Turkistan Islamic Party's magazine Islamic Turkistan contained an article on Buddhism, and described the destruction of the Buddhas of Bamyan despite attempts by the Japanese government of "infidels" to preserve the remains of the statues. The exiled Dalai Lama said he was "deeply concerned".

The destruction of the Bamyan Buddhas despite protests from the international community has been described by Michael Falser, a heritage expert at the Center for Transcultural Studies in Germany, as an attack by the Taliban against the globalising concept of "cultural heritage". The UNESCO Director-General Kōichirō Matsuura called the destruction a "...crime against culture. It is abominable to witness the cold and calculated destruction of cultural properties which were the heritage of the Afghan people, and, indeed, of the whole of humanity." Ahmad Shah Massoud, leader of the anti-Taliban resistance force, also condemned the destruction.

In Rome, the former Afghan King, Mohammed Zahir Shah, denounced the declaration in a rare press statement, calling it "against the national and historic interests of the Afghan people". Zemaryalai Tarzi, who was Afghanistan's chief archeologist in the 1970s, called it an "unacceptable decision".

2002 to present

Though the figures of the two large Buddhas have been destroyed, their outlines and some features are still recognisable within the recesses. It is also still possible for visitors to explore the monks' caves and passages that connect them. As part of the international effort to rebuild Afghanistan after the Taliban war, the Japanese government and several other organisations—among them the Afghanistan Institute in Bubendorf, Switzerland, along with the ETH in Zurich—have committed to rebuilding, perhaps by anastylosis, the two larger Buddhas. The local residents of Bamyan have also expressed their favour in restoring the structures.

In April 2002, Afghanistan's post-Taliban leader Hamid Karzai called the destruction a "national tragedy" and pledged the Buddhas to be rebuilt. He later called the reconstruction a "cultural imperative".

In September 2005, Mawlawi Mohammed Islam Mohammadi, Taliban governor of Bamyan province at the time of the destruction and widely seen as responsible for its occurrence, was elected to the Afghan Parliament. He blamed the decision to destroy the Buddhas on Al-Qaeda's influence on the Taliban. In January 2007, he was assassinated in Kabul.

Swiss filmmaker Christian Frei made a 95-minute documentary titled The Giant Buddhas on the statues, the international reactions to their destruction, and an overview of the controversy, released in March 2006. Testimony by local Afghans validates that Osama bin Laden ordered the destruction and that, initially, Mullah Omar and the Afghans in Bamyan opposed it.

Since 2002, international funding has supported recovery and stabilisation efforts at the site. Fragments of the statues are documented and stored with special attention given to securing the structure of the statue still in place. It is hoped that, in the future, partial anastylosis can be conducted with the remaining fragments. In 2009, ICOMOS constructed scaffolding within the niche to further conservation and stabilization. Nonetheless, several serious conservation and safety issues exist and the Buddhas are still listed as World Heritage in Danger.

In the summer of 2006, Afghan officials were deciding on the timetable for the re-construction of the statues. As they waited for the Afghan government and international community to decide when to rebuild them, a $1.3 million UNESCO-funded project was sorting out the chunks of clay and plaster—ranging from boulders weighing several tons to fragments the size of tennis balls—and sheltering them from the elements.

The Buddhist remnants at Bamyan were included on the 2008 World Monuments Watch List of the 100 Most Endangered Sites by the World Monuments Fund.

In 2013, the foot section of the smaller Buddha was rebuilt with iron rods, bricks and concrete by the German branch of ICOMOS. Further constructions were halted by order of UNESCO, on the grounds that the work was conducted without the organisation's knowledge or approval. The effort was contrary to UNESCO's policy of using original material for reconstructions, and it has been pointed out that it was done based on assumptions.

In 2015, a wealthy Chinese couple, Janson Hu and Liyan Yu, financed the creation of a Statue of Liberty-size 3D light projection of an artist's view of what the larger Buddha, known as Solsol to locals, might have looked like in its prime. The image was beamed into the niche one night in 2015; later the couple donated their $120,000 projector to the culture ministry.

As of November 2021, after the 2021 Taliban offensive that saw the overthrow of the Islamic Republic of Afghanistan and the return of Taliban to the government, tourists are being accepted at the site, with the Taliban promising to preserve the Bamyan valley. However, preservation work has ceased and there are no indications that reconstruction will occur in the foreseeable future.

Mural paintings
The Buddhas are surrounded by numerous caves and surfaces decorated with paintings. It is thought that the period of florescence was from the 6th to 8th century CE, until the onset of Islamic invasions. These works of art are considered as an artistic synthesis of Buddhist art and Gupta art from India, with influences from the Sasanian Empire and the Byzantine Empire, as well as the country of Tokharistan. The later paintings are attributable to the "Turk period" (7th–9th century CE).

Eastern Buddha (built in 544 to 595 CE)

Most of the surfaces in the niche housing the Buddha must have been decorated with colourful murals, surrounding the Buddha with many paintings, but only fragments were remaining in modern times. For the 38 meter Eastern Buddha, built between 544 and 595 CE, the main remaining murals were the ones on the ceiling, right above the head of the Buddha. Recent dating based on stylistic and historical analysis confirms dates for these mural which follow the carbon-rated dates for the construction of the Buddhas themselves: the murals of the Eastern Buddha have been dated to the 6th to 8th century CE by Klimburg-Salter (1989), and post 635/645 CE by Tanabe (2004). As late as 2002, Marylin Martin Rhie argued a 3rd–4th century date for the Eastern Buddha, based on artistic criteria.

Sun God
Among the most famous paintings of the Buddhas of Bamyan, the ceiling of the smaller Eastern Buddha represents a solar deity on a chariot pulled by horses, as well as ceremonial scenes with royal figures and devotees. The god is wearing a caftan in the style of Tokhara, boots, and is holding a lance. His representation is derived from the iconography of the Iranian god Mithra, as revered in Sogdia. He is riding a two-wheeled golden chariot, pulled by four horses. Two winged attendants are standing to the side of the charriot, wearing a Corinthian helmet with a feather, and holding a shield. In the top portion are wind gods, flying with a scarf held in both hands. This composition is unique, and has no equivalent in Gandhara or India, but there are some similarities with the paintings of Kizil and Dunhuang.

The central image of the Sun God on his golden chariot is framed by two lateral rows of individuals: kings and dignitaries mingling with Buddhas and Bodhisattvas. One of the personages, standing behind a monk in profile, is likely the King of Bamyan. He wears a crenulated crown with single crescent and korymbos, a round-neck tunic and a Sasanian headband.

Hephthalite donors
Several of the figures have the characteristic appearance of the Hephthalites of Tokharistan, with belted jackets with a unique lapel of their tunic being folded on the right side, the cropped hair, the hair accessories, their distinctive physiognomy and their round beardless faces. These figures must represent the donors and potentates who supported the building of the monumental giant Buddha. The individuals in this painting are very similar to the individuals depicted in Balalyk Tepe, and they may be related to the Hepthalites. They participate "to the artistic tradition of the Hephthalite ruling classes of Tukharestan".

These murals disappeared with the destructions of 2001.

Western Buddha (built between 591 and 644 CE)
A few murals also remain around the taller 55 meter Western Buddha on the ceiling and on the sides. Many are more conventionally Buddhist in character. Some of the later mural paintings show male devotees in double-lapel caftans.

Adjoining caves
Later mural paintings of Bamyan, dated to the 7th–8th centuries CE, display a variety of male devotees in double-lapel caftans. The works of art show a sophistication and cosmopolitanism comparable to other works of art of the Silk Road, such as those of Kizil, are attributable to the sponsorship of the Western Turks (Yabghus of Tokharistan). The nearby Kakrak caves also have some works of art.

After the destruction of the Buddhas, 50 more caves were revealed. In 12 of the caves, wall paintings were discovered. In December 2004, an international team of researchers stated that the wall paintings at Bamyan were painted between the 5th and the 9th centuries, rather than the 6th to 8th centuries, citing their analysis of radioactive isotopes contained in straw fibers found beneath the paintings. It is believed that the paintings were done by artists travelling on the Silk Road.

Scientists from the Tokyo Research Institute for Cultural Properties in Japan, the Centre of Research and Restoration of the French Museums in France, the Getty Conservation Institute in the United States, and the European Synchrotron Radiation Facility (ESRF) in Grenoble, France, analysed samples from the paintings, typically less than 1 mm across. They discovered that the paint contained pigments such as vermilion (red mercury sulfide) and lead white (lead carbonate). These were mixed with a range of binders, including natural resins, gums (possibly animal skin glue or egg), and oils, probably derived from walnuts or poppies. Specifically, researchers identified drying oils from murals showing Buddhas in vermilion robes sitting cross-legged amid palm leaves and mythical creatures as being painted in the middle of the 7th century. It is believed that they are the oldest known surviving examples of oil painting, possibly predating oil painting in Europe by as much as six centuries. The discovery may lead to a reassessment of works in ancient ruins in Iran, China, Pakistan, Turkey, and India.

Initial suspicion that the oils might be attributable to contamination from fingers, as the touching of the painting is encouraged in Buddhist tradition, was dispelled by spectroscopy and chromatography giving an unambiguous signal for the intentional use of drying oils rather than contaminants. Oils were discovered underneath layers of paint, unlike surface contaminants.

Scientists also found the translation of the beginning section of the original Sanskrit Pratītyasamutpāda Sutra translated by Xuanzang that spelled out the basic belief of Buddhism and said all things are transient.

Restoration

The UNESCO Expert Working Group on Afghan cultural projects convened to discuss what to do about the two statues between 3–4 March 2011 in Paris. Researcher Erwin Emmerling of Technical University Munich announced he believed it would be possible to restore the smaller statue using an organic silicon compound. The Paris conference issued a list of 39 recommendations for the safeguarding of the Bamyan site. These included leaving the larger Western niche empty as a monument to the destruction of the Buddhas, a feasibility study into the rebuilding of the Eastern Buddha, and the construction of a central museum and several smaller site museums. Work has since begun on restoring the Buddhas using the process of anastylosis, where original elements are combined with modern material. It is estimated that roughly half the pieces of the Buddhas can be put back together according to Bert Praxenthaler, a German art historian and sculptor involved in the restoration. The restoration of the caves and Buddhas has also involved training and employing local people as stone carvers. The project, which also aims to encourage tourism to the area, is being organised by UNESCO and the International Council on Monuments and Sites (ICOMOS).

The work has come under some criticism. It is felt by some, such as human rights activist Abdullah Hamadi, that the empty niches should be left as monuments to the fanaticism of the Taliban, while others believe the money could be better spent on housing and electricity for the region. Some people, including Habiba Sarabi, the provincial governor, believe that rebuilding the Buddhas would increase tourism, which would aid the surrounding communities.

Rise of Buddhas with 3D light projection
After fourteen years, on 7 June 2015, a Chinese adventurist couple Xinyu Zhang and Hong Liang filled the empty cavities where the Buddhas once stood with 3D laser light projection technology. The projector used for the installation, worth approximately $120,000, was donated by Xinyu and Hong, who were saddened by the destruction of the statues. With the desire of paying tribute, they requested permission from UNESCO and the Afghan government to do the project. About 150 local people came out to see the unveiling of the holographic statues.

Replicas

The destruction of the Buddhas of Bamyan inspired attempts to construct replicas of the Bamyan Buddhas. These include the following.

It was funded by a Chinese businessman, Liang Simian. The project appears to have been given up for unknown reasons.
 In Sri Lanka, a full-scale replica has been created, which is now known as the Tsunami Honganji Viharaya at Pareliya. It is dedicated to the victims of the 2005 tsunami in the presence of Mahinda Rajapaksha. It was funded by Japan's Hongan-ji Temple of Kyoto and was inaugurated in 2006.
 In Poland, the Arkady Fiedler Museum of Tolerance has a replica of a Bamiyan Buddha.
 An  stone Buddha was inaugurated at Sarnath in India in 2011. It stands within the Thai Buddhist Vihara.

Gallery

In popular culture
Despite the Buddhas's destruction, the ruins continue to be a popular culture landmark, bolstered by increasing domestic and international tourism to the Bamyan Valley. The area around the ruins has since been used for the traditional game of buzkashi, as well as for music festivals and other events. The music video of pop singer Aryana Sayeed's hit 2015 song "Yaar-e Bamyani" was also shot by the ruins.

The statues inspired Islamic writers in historical times. The larger statue appears as the malevolent giant Salsal in medieval Turkish tales.

In June 1971, the Japanese Empress Michiko visited the Buddhas during a royal state visit to Afghanistan with her husband. Upon her return to Japan, she composed a waka poem.

A 2012  novel by Rajesh Talwar titled An Afghan Winter provides a fictional backdrop to the destruction of the Buddhas and its impact on the global Buddhist community.

The 2022 Indian film Ram Setu shows the destruction of the Buddhas of Bamiyan and an archaeological team's subsequent attempts to salvage the remains where they discover a fictional treasure belonging to Raja Dahir and a colossal reclining Buddha (which has been described in the writings of Xuanzang but has not actually been discovered).

See also

 Buddha Collapsed out of Shame
 Destruction of art in Afghanistan
 Buddhism in Afghanistan
 Buddhism in Central Asia
 Aniconism
 Aniconism in Islam
 Iconoclasm
 Destruction of cultural heritage by the Islamic State
 Greco-Buddhism
 Index of Buddhism-related articles
 Islamist destruction of Timbuktu heritage sites
 List of colossal sculptures in situ
 List of destroyed heritage
 Ancient history of Afghanistan
 Silk Road transmission of Buddhism
 List of World Heritage in Danger

References

Further reading 

 Cloonan, Michele V. "The Paradox of Preservation", Library Trends, Summer 2007.
 Braj Basi Lal; R. Sengupta (2008). A Report on the Preservation of Buddhist Monuments at Bamiyan in Afghanistan. Islamic Wonders Bureau. .
 Kassaimah, Sahar. "Afghani Ambassador Speaks At USC", IslamOnline, 12 March 2001.
 Maniscalco, Fabio. World Heritage and War, monographic series "Mediterraneum", vol. 6, Naples 2007, Massa Publisher 
 Noyes, James. "Bamiyan Ten Years On: What this Anniversary tells us about the New Global Iconoclasm", "Telos", 1 March 2010.
 Tarzi, Zemaryala. L'architecture et le décors rupestre des grottes de Bamiyan 
 Weber, Olivier, The Assassinated Memory (Mille et Une Nuits, 2001)
 Weber, Olivier, Tha Afghan Hawk: travel in the country of talibans (Robert Laffont, 2001)
 Weber, Olivier, On the Silk Roads (with Reza, 2007)
 Wriggins, Sally Hovey. Xuanzang: A Buddhist Pilgrim on the Silk Road. Boulder: Westview Press, 1996
 
 "Afghanistan 1969–1974: February 2001"
 "Artist to recreate Afghan Buddhas". BBC News, 9 August 2005.
 "Bamian Buddha Statues and Theosophy"
 "Pakistani, Saudi engineers helped destroy Buddhas" Daily Times, Sunday, 19 March 2006.
 "The Rediff Interview/Mullah Omar, 12 April 2004"

External links

 Japan offered to hide Bamiyan statues, but Taliban asked Japan to convert to Islam instead
 News articles about the Buddhas of Bamyan
 Photos of the Buddhas of Bamyan
 Bamyan Afghanistan Laser Project
 World Heritage Tour: 360 degree image (after destruction)
 Bamyan Development Community Portal for cultural heritage management of Bamyan
 The World Monuments Fund's Watch List 2008 listing for Bamyan
 
 The Valley of Bamiyan A tourist pamphlet from 1967
 Researchers Say They Can Restore 1 of Destroyed Bamiyan Buddhas
 Secrets of the Bamiyan Buddhas, CNRS
 Bamiyan photo gallery, UNESCO
 Secrets of Bamiyan Buddhist murals. ESRF
 Photo Feature Covering Bamiyan Site

6th-century religious buildings and structures
Colossal Buddha statues
Arts in Afghanistan
Central Asian Buddhist sites
2001 in religion
2001 in Afghanistan
6th-century Buddhism
Afghan Civil War (1996–2001)
Anti-Buddhism
Archaeological sites in Afghanistan
Bamyan Province
Buddha statues
Buddhism in Afghanistan
Buddhist art
Buddhist pilgrimage sites in Afghanistan
Buildings and structures demolished in 2001
Demolished buildings and structures in Afghanistan
Destroyed sculptures
Hazarajat
Iconoclasm
Mountain monuments and memorials
Rock art in Asia
Silk Road
Taliban
Tourist attractions in Afghanistan
Vandalized works of art
World Heritage Sites in Afghanistan
World Heritage Sites in Danger
Removed statues
Persecution of Buddhists by Muslims
Stone Buddha statues